Nir Bitton (or Biton, ; born 30 October 1991) is an Israeli professional footballer who plays as a centre-back or as a defensive midfielder for Israeli Premier League club Maccabi Tel Aviv and Israel national team which he also captains occasionally.

Early and personal life
Bitton was born and raised in Ashdod, Israel, to a family of both Sephardi Jewish and Mizrahi Jewish descent. He was enlisted and served as a soldier in the Israel Defense Forces.

He married his Israeli girlfriend Bar ( Shimon) in 2014: the couple have two children, Emma and Tom.

Club career

SC Ashdod
Bitton broke into the senior team of his home-town club SC Ashdod at the age of 17 in an Israeli Premier League match on 25 April 2009, and went on to make over 120 appearances.

Celtic
On 30 August 2013, Bitton signed a four-year deal with Scottish Premiership club Celtic, for a fee of around £700,000 and a 20% sell-on clause from Israeli Premier League club SC Ashdod.

He made his debut for the club on 18 September, in a Champions League group stage match against AC Milan, coming into the game as a late substitute in the 89th minute. Three weeks later he made another Champions League appearance for Celtic, coming as a 77th-minute substitute against Ajax on 22 October, but was sent off eleven minutes later for a late tackle on Thulani Serero. The resulting suspension and a few niggling injuries hindered Bitton's efforts to establish himself in the team, but he still managed to make a total of 20 appearances for Celtic by the end of his first season there. Celtic won their third successive league title, and Bitton's 15 league appearances saw him pick up his first major honour.

In the 2014–15 season, Bitton scored in Celtic's first league match of the season from the penalty spot after a controversial red card for St Johnstone defender Dave Mackay. Celtic winger Derk Boerrigter was later given a 3-match ban for simulation. Later in the season, Bitton scored a stunning 30-yard goal against Dundee. in a 5–0 win. He scored another long-distance strike on 12 August 2015, netting from 25 yards into the top corner in a 2–2 draw with Kilmarnock.

To begin the 2015–16 season, on 19 August 2015, Bitton scored against Swedish side Malmö FF in a 3–2 win at Celtic Park in the first leg of the Champions League playoffs. On 2 November 2015, Bitton was signed a new contract which would keep him at Celtic until the summer of 2020, and again on 16 December 2019 he extended his contract up to 2023. 

On 13 May 2022, Celtic announced that Bitton and teammate Tom Rogic would both be leaving the club after the final game of the season against Motherwell. Bitton said: "When I came to Celtic I never thought I would be part of such exciting times and it truly has been amazing to be part of such a great club. I have worked with some great managers and team-mates and I thank them all for those times and all we achieved together." Bitton came on as a substitute for club captain Callum McGregor in the 85th minute, as Celtic ran out 6–0 winners. Rogic and Bitton brought out the Scottish Premiership trophy together, which McGregor then lifted aloft with his departing teammates standing on either side.

Bitton also occasionally captained Celtic.

Maccabi Tel Aviv 
On 1 July 2022, Bitton joined Israeli Premier League club Maccabi Tel Aviv on a free transfer, signing a two-year contract with an option for a third year. The player thus returned to Israel after spending nine years in Scotland.

International career

In 2009, Bitton represented his native Israel at the 2009 Maccabiah Games, and the team won a bronze medal. He played for the only Israel U-21 team to qualify for the UEFA European U21 Championship in 2013.

He made his senior debut for Israel in a friendly match against Uruguay on 26 May 2010. Bitton played a major role in qualifying games for the 2016 UEFA Euro Tournament. He scored his first goal for the national team against Andorra in a 4–0 victory On 3 September 2015. Ever since 23 March 2016, Bitton is being used as a second or a third Captain for the senior Israel national team. Bitton debuted as the first Captain of the senior national team, in a 3–2 home win for Israel against Faroe Islands on 15 November 2021 (even after Eitan Tibi, Israel's vice-captain, was substituted in), at the 2022 FIFA World Cup qualifiers.

Career statistics

Club

International goals
Scores and results list Israel's goal tally first, score column indicates score after each Bitton goal.

Honours
Celtic
Scottish Premiership (8): 2013–14, 2014–15, 2015–16, 2016–17, 2017–18, 2018–19, 2019–20, 2021–22
Scottish Cup (4): 2016–17, 2017–18, 2018–19, 2019–20
Scottish League Cup (6): 2014–15, 2016–17, 2017–18, 2018–19, 2019–20, 2021–22

See also
List of Jewish footballers
List of Jews in sports
List of Israelis
Liel Abada

References

External links
 
 
 

1991 births
Living people
Israeli Mizrahi Jews
Israeli Jews
Israeli Sephardi Jews
Footballers from Ashdod
Israeli footballers
Jewish footballers
Association football midfielders
F.C. Ashdod players
Celtic F.C. players
Maccabi Tel Aviv F.C. players
Israeli Premier League players
Scottish Professional Football League players
Competitors at the 2009 Maccabiah Games
Maccabiah Games medalists in football
Maccabiah Games bronze medalists for Israel
Israel under-21 international footballers
Israel international footballers
Israeli expatriate footballers
Expatriate footballers in Scotland
Israeli expatriate sportspeople in Scotland
Association football defenders
Association football central defenders